James G. Patterson was a teacher and state legislator in Mississippi. He represented Yazoo County in the Mississippi House of Representatives 1874-1875. On October 20, 1875, amidst a wave of political violence, he was lynched.

See also
 Mississippi Plan
 African-American officeholders during and following the Reconstruction era

References

African-American state legislators in Mississippi
Members of the Mississippi House of Representatives
Lynching deaths in Mississippi
1875 deaths
Year of birth missing
African-American politicians during the Reconstruction Era
People from Yazoo County, Mississippi